Imperial Spoils: The Curious Case of the Elgin Marbles is a 1987 book by Christopher Hitchens on the controversy surrounding the removal by Thomas Bruce, 7th Earl of Elgin of the Parthenon's sculptured friezes (which became known as the Elgin Marbles), and his subsequent sale of the Marbles to the British Museum. Hitchens examines the history of the artefacts and the question of whether they should be returned to Greece.

References

1987 non-fiction books
Books by Christopher Hitchens
Books about politics of the United Kingdom
Marble sculptures in the United Kingdom
History books about politics
Thomas Bruce, 7th Earl of Elgin
Parthenon
Chatto & Windus books